Summer Madness may refer to:

 "Summer Madness" (instrumental), a 1974 instrumental tune by Kool & the Gang
 "Summer Madness" (Lead song), 2006
 Summer Madness (festival), a Christian festival in Northern Ireland
 the UK release title of the 1955 Katharine Hepburn film Summertime
 Angry Birds: Summer Madness, an animated television series